Zoe Rae (born Zoë Rae Bech; July 13, 1910 – May 20, 2006) was an American child actress of the silent era. She appeared in 54 films between 1915 and 1920. She was called "the greatest little emotional actress on record" by Motion Picture Magazine.

When she was ten, her father decided she could not make more movies until she had finished schooling. After college, she tried screenwriting and opened her a dance studio in Hollywood She would marry fellow dancer Ronald Foster Barlow in the early 1930s.

Selected filmography
 The Canceled Mortgage (1915)
 Bettina Loved a Soldier (1916)
 Naked Hearts (1916)
 The Bugler of Algiers (1916)
 A Kentucky Cinderella (1917)
 The Silent Lady (1917)
 The Cricket (1917)
 Heart Strings (1917)
 The Circus of Life (1917)
 My Little Boy (1917)
 The Little Pirate (1917)
 Polly Put the Kettle On (1917)
 The Magic Eye (1918)
 The Star Prince (1918)
 Ace of the Saddle (1919)

References

External links

 "Zoe Rae, Found and Lost" — Lon Davis, Silents Are Golden

1910 births
2006 deaths
American film actresses
American silent film actresses
Actresses from Oregon
People from Newberg, Oregon
20th-century American actresses
21st-century American women